Billy Gernon is an American college baseball coach, currently serving as head coach of the Western Michigan Broncos baseball team. He was named to that position prior to the 2011 season. He previously served as head coach of the IPFW Mastodons baseball team during their transition from Division II to Division I.

Gernon played three seasons at Indiana–Southeast before transferring to Indiana for his final season.  In his senior season, he served as the Hoosiers closer.  He later served as a student assistant coach with the Hoosiers.  During that 1996 season, Indiana claimed the Big Ten baseball tournament championship and earned a berth in the 1996 NCAA Division I baseball tournament.  He then served two seasons as pitching coach at IPFW while completing an education degree.  He became head coach of the Mastodons prior to the 2000 season.  Gernon guided the team from Division II to Division I and entry into The Summit League in 2008.  He then served two seasons as an assistant at Michigan State before earning the head coaching job at Western Michigan.

Head coaching record

See also
List of current NCAA Division I baseball coaches

References

External links
Billy Gernon Head Coach, Western Michigan University Broncos

Living people
Indiana Hoosiers baseball coaches
Indiana Hoosiers baseball players
Indiana–Southeast Grenadiers baseball players
Purdue Fort Wayne Mastodons baseball coaches
Michigan State Spartans baseball coaches
Western Michigan Broncos baseball coaches
Year of birth missing (living people)